SAVAK is an indie rock band from Brooklyn, New York. Their debut album Best of Luck in Future Endeavors was released on Comedy Minus One in May 2016, garnering positive reviews in Magnet Magazine, Brooklyn Vegan, Noisey, Vol. 1 Brooklyn and Jersey Beat. The record received four stars in Mojo Magazine, who praised their "superior twin-guitar slash." Since then the band has released 3 additional albums on the Ernest Jenning) record label including Cut-Ups in 2017, Beg Your Pardon in 2018 and Rotting Teeth in the Horse's Mouth in 2020. SAVAK released their latest album Human Error / Human Delight in April of 2022 on their own record label, Peculiar Works Music.

Sohrab Habibion of SAVAK was previously in the bands Obits and Edsel. Fellow singer and guitar-player Michael Jaworski spent time in both The Cops and Virgin Islands. Drummer Matt Schulz also serves a similar role with Holy Fuck.

Band members
Sohrab Habibion – vocals, guitar
Michael Jaworski - vocals, guitar, bass, keys
Matt Schulz – drums

Discography

Albums
 Best of Luck in Future Endeavors LP (2016, Comedy Minus One)
 Cut-Ups LP (2017, Ernest Jenning)
 Beg Your Pardon LP (2018, Ernest Jenning)
 Rotting Teeth in The Horse's Mouth LP (2020, Ernest Jenning)
 Human Error / Human Delight LP (2022, Peculiar Works/Ernest Jenning/Geenger)

Singles
 "Where Should I Start?" / "Expensive Things" (2018, Modern City Records)
 "Green & Desperate" / "This Dying Lake" (2018, Orangerie)
 "The Point of the Point" / "Checked Out" (2020, Dromedary and Peculiar Works)
 "Feel What You Feel" / "Access Egress" (2020, Peculiar Works)

EP's
 "Mirror Maker" (2019, Peculiar Works and Ernest Jenning)

References

External links 
 
 Ernest Jenning Record Co. page
 Comedy Minus One Records page

Indie rock musical groups from New York (state)
Musical groups established in 2015
Musical_groups_from_Brooklyn
2015 establishments in New York City